The COVID-19 pandemic in Mali is part of the ongoing worldwide pandemic of coronavirus disease 2019 caused by severe acute respiratory syndrome coronavirus 2. The virus was confirmed to have reached Mali in March 2020.

Background 
On 12 January 2020, the World Health Organization (WHO) confirmed that a novel coronavirus was the cause of a respiratory illness in a cluster of people in Wuhan City, Hubei Province, China, which was reported to the WHO on 31 December 2019.

The case fatality ratio for COVID-19 has been much lower than SARS of 2003, but the transmission has been significantly greater, with a significant total death toll. Model-based simulations for Mali suggest that the 95% confidence interval for the time-varying reproduction number R t has been stable below 1.0 since December 2020.

Timeline

March 2020 
 On 25 March, Mali confirmed its first two COVID-19 cases.

 On 26 March, two new cases were registered by the Ministry of Health and Social Affairs. To address the epidemic which had so far spared the country, in an address to the nation, Ibrahim Boubacar Kéïta, the President of the Republic of Mali declared a state of emergency and instituted a curfew from 9.00 p.m. to 5:00 a.m.

 On 27 March, 7 new positive tests for Coronavirus: Mali rose to 11 cases.

 On 28 March, 7 new cases were confirmed, the total rose to 18. The first COVID-19 death occurred.

 On 31 March, 25 persons had tested positive and there had been 2 deaths according to health authorities.

April to June 2020 
 By the end of April there had been 490 confirmed cases of which 329 were still active, and 26 deaths.

 By the end of May there had been 1,265 confirmed cases of which 472 were still active, and 77 deaths.

 By the end of June there had been 2,181 confirmed cases of which 591 were still active, and 116 deaths.

July to September 2020 
 There were 354 confirmed cases in July, bringing the total number to 2,535 of which 474 were still active at the end of the month. The death toll rose by eight to 124.

 There were 2,640 confirmed cases, 528 active cases, 1,987 recoveries, and 125 deaths as of August 16, two days prior to the mutiny that led to the coup. During the month there were 241 confirmed cases, raising the total number to 2,776. The death toll rose to 126. There were 481 active cases at the end of the month.

 As of September 12, there were 2,916 confirmed cases, 512 active cases, 2,276 recoveries, and 128 deaths. During the rest of September there were 185 more cases, bringing the total number of confirmed cases to 3,101. Three more deaths brought the death toll to 131. The number of recovered patients increased to 2,443, leaving 527 active cases at the end of the month.

October to December 2020
 There were 453 new cases in October, bringing the total number of confirmed cases to 3,554. The death toll rose to 136. The number of recovered patients increased to 2,753, leaving 665 active cases at the end of the month.

 There were 1,156 new cases in November, bringing the total number of confirmed cases to 4,710. The death toll rose to 156. The number of recovered patients increased to 3,206, leaving 1,348 active cases at the end of the month.

 There were 2,319 new cases in December, bringing the total number of confirmed cases to 7,029. The death toll rose to 269. The number of recovered patients increased to 4,548, leaving 2,212 active cases at the end of the month.

January to March 2021
 There were 1,062 new cases in January, bringing the total number of confirmed cases to 8,091. The death toll rose to 330. The number of recovered patients increased to 5,945, leaving 1,816 active cases at the end of the month.

 There were 285 new cases in February, bringing the total number of confirmed cases to 8,376. The death toll rose to 353. The number of recovered patients increased to 6,402, leaving 1,621 active cases at the end of the month.

 There were 1,666 new cases in March, bringing the total number of confirmed cases to 10,042. The death toll rose to 385. The number of recovered patients increased to 6,930, leaving 2,727 active cases at the end of the month. Mass vaccination started on 31 March, initially with 396,000 doses of the Covishield vaccine provided through the COVAX facility.

April to June 2021
 There were 3,816 new cases in April, taking the total number of confirmed cases to 13,858. The death toll rose to 484. The number of recovered patients increased to 8,560, leaving 4,814 active cases at the end of the month.

 There were 407 new cases in May, taking the total number of confirmed cases to 14,265. The death toll rose to 517. The number of recovered patients increased to 9,700, leaving 4,048 active cases at the end of the month.

 There were 57 new cases in June, taking the total number of confirmed cases to 14,322. The death toll rose to 525. The number of recovered patients increased to 10,059, leaving 3,738 active cases at the end of the month.

July to September 2021
 There were 262 new cases in July, taking the total number of confirmed cases to 14,584. The death toll rose to 532. The number of recovered patients increased to 13,945, leaving 107 active cases at the end of the month.

 There were 305 new cases in August, taking the total number of confirmed cases to 14,889. The death toll rose to 539. The number of recovered patients increased to 14,104, leaving 246 active cases at the end of the month.

 There were 330 new cases in September, taking the total number of confirmed cases to 15,219. The death toll rose to 548. The number of recovered patients increased to 14,307, leaving 364 active cases at the end of the month.

October to December 2021
 There were 855 new cases in October, taking the total number of confirmed cases to 16,074. The death toll rose to 563. The number of recovered patients increased to 14,659, leaving 852 active cases at the end of the month.

 There were 1,360 new cases in November, taking the total number of confirmed cases to 17,434. The death toll rose to 606. The number of recovered patients increased to 15,161, leaving 567 active cases at the end of the month.

 There were 3,574 new cases in December, raising the total number of confirmed cases to 21,008. The death toll rose to 660. The number of recovered patients increased to 18,735, leaving 1,031 active cases at the end of the month. Modeling carried out by WHO’s Regional Office for Africa suggests that due to under-reporting, the true cumulative number of infections by the end of 2021 was around 9 million while the true number of COVID-19 deaths was around 10,650.

January to March 2022
 There were 9,044 new cases in January, raising the total number of confirmed cases to 30,052. The death toll rose to 714. The number of recovered patients increased to 26,338, leaving 3,152 active cases at the end of the month.

 There were 329 new cases in February, bringing the total number of confirmed cases to 30,381. The death toll rose to 722. The number of recovered patients increased to 29,498, leaving 74 active cases at the end of the month.

 There were 108 new cases in March, bringing the total number of confirmed cases to 30,489. The death toll rose to 728. The number of recovered patients increased to 29,638, leaving 43 active cases at the end of the month.

April to June 2022
 There were 354 new cases in April, bringing the total number of confirmed cases to 30,843. The death toll rose to 732. The number of recovered patients increased to 29,896, leaving 215 active cases at the end of the month.

 There were 253 new cases in May, bringing the total number of confirmed cases to 31,096. The death toll rose to 734. The number of recovered patients increased to 30,207, leaving 155 active cases at the end of the month.

 There were 69 new cases in June, bringing the total number of confirmed cases to 31,165. The death toll rose to 737. The number of recovered patients increased to 30,330, leaving 98 active cases at the end of the month.

July to September 2022
 There were 63 new cases in July, bringing the total number of confirmed cases to 31,228. The death toll rose to 739.

 There were 184 new cases in August, bringing the total number of confirmed cases to 31,412. The death toll remained unchanged. The number of recovered patients increased to 30,469, leaving 84 active cases at the end of the month.

 There were 1226 new cases in September, bringing the total number of confirmed cases to 32,638. The death toll rose to 742. The number of recovered patients increased to 31,620, leaving 276 active cases at the end of the month.

October to December 2022
 There were 95 new cases in October, bringing the total number of confirmed cases to 32,733. The death toll remained unchanged. The number of recovered patients increased to 31,898, leaving 93 active cases at the end of the month.
 There were 27 new cases in November, bringing the total number of confirmed cases to 32,760. The death toll remained unchanged. The number of recovered patients increased to 31,941, leaving 77 active cases at the end of the month.
 There were ten new cases in December, bringing the total number of confirmed cases to 32,770. The death toll rose to 743. The number of recovered patients increased to 31,950, leaving 77 active cases at the end of the month.

January to March 2023
 There were ten new cases in January, bringing the total number of confirmed cases to 32,780. The death toll remained unchanged. The number of recovered patients increased to 31,955, leaving 82 active cases at the end of the month.
 There were 218 new cases in February, bringing the total number of confirmed cases to 32,998. The death toll remained unchanged. The number of recovered patients increased to 32,074, leaving 181 active cases at the end of the month.

Statistics

Confirmed new cases per day

Confirmed deaths per day

Preventive measures 
On 18 March, President Ibrahim Boubacar Keita suspended flights from affected countries, closed schools and banned large public gatherings. However planned elections in March–April, which had already been postponed several times for the poor security situation in the country, went ahead as planned.

See also 

 COVID-19 pandemic in Africa
 COVID-19 pandemic by country and territory
 2020 in Mali
 2020 in West Africa

References

External links 

 
coronavirus pandemic
coronavirus pandemic
Mali
Mali
Disease outbreaks in Mali